Cryptothele is a genus of lichen within the family Lichinaceae. The genus contains eight species, two of which are found in North America.

References

External links
Cryptothele at Index Fungorum

Lichinomycetes
Lichen genera